is a single by Japanese dance pop band AAA, released on August 18, 2010. It is their second consecutive single produced by Tetsuya Komuro, after "Aitai Riyū/Dream After Dream (Yume Kara Sameta Yume)".

Promotion

The single had two tie-ups: "Makenai Kokoro" was used as the theme song of the television drama Gakeppuchi no Eri: Kono Yo de Ichiban Daichi na 'Kane' no Hanashi, while "Day By Day" was used in commercials for Avex Artist Academy. Band member Takahiro Nishijima featured as an actor in the seventh episode of Gakeppuchi no Eri.

Single contents
Six versions of the single exist: a CD only version, two DVD editions, and three Mu-Mo store exclusive versions. DVD edition A featured the music video for the song, while DVD edition B featured a documentary on the making of the music video for their previous single "Aitai Riyū."

All versions feature "Makenai Kokoro" and "Day By Day", while only the CD only version features the group's cover of H Jungle with T's 1995 number 1 single, "Wow War Tonight (Toki ni wa Okose yo Movement)". The Mu-Mo exclusive versions each feature one of three live talk tracks, where the band members discuss the time since their debut in 2005.

Track listings

Chart rankings

Reported sales

Release history

References

External links 
Avex "Makenai Kokoro" profile 
  Avex channel

2010 singles
AAA (band) songs
Japanese-language songs
Japanese television drama theme songs
Song recordings produced by Tetsuya Komuro
Songs written by Tetsuya Komuro
2010 songs
Avex Trax singles
Songs written by Mitsuhiro Hidaka